David Ceccarelli (born c. 1935) is an American former politician in the state of Washington. He served the 34th district from 1967 to 1977.

References

Living people
1930s births
Democratic Party members of the Washington House of Representatives